Sømand i knibe is a 1960 Danish family film directed by and starring Lau Lauritzen Jr.

Cast
 Lau Lauritzen Jr. as Admiral
 Ebbe Langberg as Kaptajnløjtnant Poul Adam
 Hans Kurt as Fabrikant
 Ghita Nørby as Eva Thygesen
 Jeanne Darville as Tove Thygesen
 Judy Gringer as Mette
 Peter Marcell as Søløjtnant Peter Holm
 Ib Mossin as Poul
 Per Wiking as Fessor
 Dirch Passer as Freddy
 Otto Brandenburg as Jesper
 Hugo Herrestrup as Mugge
 Ove Rud as Orlogskaptajn Hede
 Kurt Erik Nielsen as Mester
 Bertel Lauring as Oversergent
 Ole Monty as Bageren
 Ole Ishøj as Søløjtnant
 Bent Vejlby
 Karl Stegger as Mand der fortæller søhistorier

References

External links

1960 films
Danish children's films
1960s Danish-language films
ASA Filmudlejning films
Films directed by Lau Lauritzen Jr.
Films scored by Sven Gyldmark